The Banu Sahm is a clan of the Quraish tribe. They are related to the Banu Jumah, as they both were part of a larger clan descended from the same ancestor, the Banu Husays.

People
Khunais ibn Hudhaifa
 'Amr ibn al-'As
 Hisham ibn al-A'as
 'Abd Allah ibn 'Amr ibn al-'As

See also
Islam
At-Takathur, verse 1-2

References

 
Arab groups